Trichocentrum cavendishianum is a species of orchid found from Mexico to Central America.

References

External links 

cavendishianum
Orchids of Mexico
Orchids of Central America